Nahuel Eugenio Banegas (born 6 October 1996) is an Argentine professional footballer who plays as a left-back for Central Córdoba SdE.

Career
Banegas came through the youth ranks at Tigre. In July 2018, Banegas departed to Primera D Metropolitana with Puerto Nuevo. One goal in twenty-six matches followed in 2018–19. July 2019 saw the left-back head to Villa Dálmine of Primera B Nacional. His first appearance came in a victory over Instituto on 17 August, which preceded a further sixteen matches for the club. On 31 August 2020, Banegas was loaned to Primera División side Central Córdoba SdE with a purchase option. He made his debut in a home defeat to Independiente in the Copa de la Liga Profesional on 1 November.

On 16 August 2021, Central Córdoba triggered the purchase option on Banega, signing him on a permanently deal until the end of 2023.

Career statistics
.

Notes

References

External links

1996 births
Living people
Sportspeople from Buenos Aires Province
Argentine footballers
Association football defenders
Primera D Metropolitana players
Primera Nacional players
Argentine Primera División players
Club Atlético Puerto Nuevo players
Villa Dálmine footballers
Central Córdoba de Santiago del Estero footballers